HD 23474 (HR 1154) is a double star in the southern circumpolar constellation Mensa. It has an apparent magnitude of 6.30, placing it near the max naked eye visibility.

The primary or visible component has a stellar classification of K2 III, indicating that it is a red giant.

References

Mensa (constellation)
K-type giants
Double stars
Mensae, 3
PD-78 105
023474
016827
1154